Ryan Martinez (born August 27, 1982) is a retired American mixed martial artist. A professional from 2009 until 2014, he competed for Bellator and ProElite.

Background
Martinez was born in Greeley, Colorado. He grew up wrestling and had a promising future, being a top ranked wrestler in the state of Colorado (third in the country as a senior) while at Greeley West High School, and a two-time All-American. The young Martinez was offered full-scholarships from many different colleges, but began getting involved with drugs and alcohol, and eventually dropped out of high school as he began dealing drugs.

Martinez was addicted to methamphetamines and was arrested once for drug trafficking. He spent three and a half years in prison and two years on parole. The time in prison was especially hard on Martinez because he missed the first two years of his daughter Taylor's life.

After his time in prison, he got a job as an ironworker and started to train MMA, which helped him to overcome his past.

MMA career

Early career
After a successful amateur career, Martinez began as a professional in 2010. He fought mainly for the Colorado-based promotion Fight To Win. With a MMA record of 5–1, he signed with ProElite.

ProElite
Martinez made his debut against former NCAA division I national wrestling champion Mark Ellis on November 5, 2011, in the opening round of the heavyweight tournament. He won via unanimous decision and advanced to the semifinal.

In the semifinal on January 21, 2012, Martinez faced Cody Griffin. He won via unanimous decision.

Martinez was expected to face Richard Odoms in the finals, but in early 2012 ProElite has entered into a partnership with DREAM, which has gone out of business soon after. Martinez then signed with Bellator.

Bellator Fighting Championships
Martinez made his debut against Mike Wessel on August 24, 2012, at Bellator 73. He lost via split decision (29-28 Wessel, 30-27 Martinez, 29-28 Wessel).

Martinez faced Manny Lara on October 5, 2012, at Bellator 75. He won via majority decision (29-27, 29-27, 28-28).

Martinez faced Travis Wiuff on March 21, 2013, at Bellator 93. He won via knockout in the very first round.

In June 2013, Martinez entered the Bellator Summer Series Heavyweight tournament as an injury replacement for Vinicius Queiroz. He faced Rich Hale in the opening round at Bellator 96 and won via knockout in the first round.

Martinez faced Vitaly Minakov in the finals on July 31, 2013, at Bellator 97. He lost via TKO in the third round.

Martinez then fought Lavar Johnson in the quarterfinals of Bellator's Season Ten Heavyweight tournament at Bellator 111. He lost via TKO in the first round.

Martinez faced Nick Rossborough on September 26, 2014, at Bellator 126. He lost the fight via TKO due to injury after tearing his left bicep in the first round.

Championships and accomplishments
Bellator Fighting Championships
Bellator 2013 Summer Series Heavyweight Tournament Runner-Up

Mixed martial arts record

|-
|Loss
|align=center|10–5
|Nick Rossborough
|TKO (arm injury)
|Bellator 126
|
|align=center|1
|align=center|5:00
|Phoenix, Arizona, United States
|Martinez tore his left bicep in round one.
|-
|Loss
|align=center|10–4
|Lavar Johnson
|TKO (punches)
|Bellator 111
|
|align=center|1
|align=center|4:22
|Thackerville, Oklahoma, United States
|Bellator Season 10 Heavyweight Tournament Quarterfinal.
|-
|Loss
|align=center|10–3
|Vitaly Minakov
|TKO (punches)
|Bellator 97
|
|align=center|3
|align=center|4:02
|Rio Rancho, New Mexico, United States
|Bellator 2013 Summer Series Heavyweight Tournament Final.
|-
|Win
|align=center|10–2
|Rich Hale
|KO (punches)
|Bellator 96
|
|align=center|1
|align=center|2:19
|Thackerville, Oklahoma, United States
|Bellator 2013 Summer Series Heavyweight Tournament Semifinal.
|-
|Win
|align=center|9–2
|Travis Wiuff
|KO (punches)
|Bellator 93
|
|align=center|1
|align=center|0:18
|Lewiston, Maine, United States
|
|-
|Win
|align=center|8–2
|Manny Lara
|Decision (majority)
|Bellator 75
|
|align=center|3
|align=center|5:00
|Hammond, Indiana, United States
|
|-
|Loss
|align=center|7–2
|Mike Wessel
|Decision (split)
|Bellator 73
|
|align=center|3
|align=center|5:00
|Tunica Resorts, Mississippi, United States
|
|-
|Win
|align=center|7–1
|Cody Griffin
|Decision (unanimous)
|ProElite 3: Da Spyder vs. Minowaman
|
|align=center|3
|align=center|5:00
|Honolulu, Hawaii, United States
|ProElite Heavyweight Tournament Semifinal.
|-
|Win
|align=center|6–1
|Mark Ellis
|Decision (unanimous)
|ProElite 2: Big Guns
|
|align=center|3
|align=center|5:00
|Moline, Illinois, United States
|ProElite Heavyweight Tournament Quarterfinal.
|-
|Win
|align=center|5–1
|Brandon Endriss
|Technical submission (guillotine choke)
|ROF 41: Bragging Rights
|
|align=center|1
|align=center|3:45
|Broomfield, Colorado, United States
|
|-
|Win
|align=center|4–1
|Richard White
|TKO (submission to punches)
|Fight To Win: Outlaws
|
|align=center|1
|align=center|2:24
|Denver, Colorado, United States
|
|-
|Win
|align=center|3–1
|Jeremiah Martinez
|TKO (punches)
|Fight To Win: Mortal Combat
|
|align=center|1
|align=center|0:51
|Denver, Colorado, United States
|
|-
|Loss
|align=center|2–1
|Derrick Lewis
|TKO (punches)
|Fight to Win/King of Champions: Worlds Collide
|
|align=center|2
|align=center|1:03
|Denver, Colorado, United States
|
|-
|Win
|align=center|2–0
|Justyn Riley
|KO (punch)
|Fight To Win: War
|
|align=center|1
|align=center|0:26
|Denver, Colorado, United States
|
|-
|Win
|align=center|1–0
|Vernon Lewis
|TKO (punches)
|Fight To Win: Phenoms
|
|align=center|2
|align=center|3:22
|Denver, Colorado, United States
|

Mixed martial arts amateur record

|-
|Win
|align=center|4–0
|Omar Belal
|KO (suplex and punches)
|RMBB: MMA Madness
|
|align=center|1
|align=center|0:54
|Sheridan, Colorado, United States
|
|-
|Win
|align=center|3–0
|Donnie Bell
|TKO (punches)
|RMBB: Battle in the Cage: Total Domination
|
|align=center|1
|align=center|0:13
|Sheridan, Colorado, United States
|
|-
|Win
|align=center|2–0
|Emanuel Martinez
|TKO (punches)
|RMBB: Baddest of the Bad
|
|align=center|1
|align=center|0:34
|Sheridan, Colorado, United States
|
|-
|Win
|align=center|1–0
|Shawn Martin
|TKO (punches)
|RMBB: Battle of the Belts
|
|align=center|1
|align=center|0:19
|Sheridan, Colorado, United States
|

References

1987 births
Living people
People from Greeley, Colorado
American male mixed martial artists
Heavyweight mixed martial artists
Mixed martial artists utilizing wrestling
Sportspeople from Colorado